The Novokuznetsk constituency (No.104) is a Russian legislative constituency in Kemerovo Oblast. Until 2007 the constituency covered exclusively the city of Novokuznetsk and its suburbs, however, after 2015 redistricting the constituency lost much of its suburban part and was extended to southern Kemerovo Oblast.

Members elected

Election results

1993

|-
! colspan=2 style="background-color:#E9E9E9;text-align:left;vertical-align:top;" |Candidate
! style="background-color:#E9E9E9;text-align:left;vertical-align:top;" |Party
! style="background-color:#E9E9E9;text-align:right;" |Votes
! style="background-color:#E9E9E9;text-align:right;" |%
|-
|style="background-color:"|
|align=left|Viktor Medikov
|align=left|Independent
|
|45.90%
|-
| colspan="5" style="background-color:#E9E9E9;"|
|- style="font-weight:bold"
| colspan="3" style="text-align:left;" | Total
| 
| 100%
|-
| colspan="5" style="background-color:#E9E9E9;"|
|- style="font-weight:bold"
| colspan="4" |Source:
|
|}

1995

|-
! colspan=2 style="background-color:#E9E9E9;text-align:left;vertical-align:top;" |Candidate
! style="background-color:#E9E9E9;text-align:left;vertical-align:top;" |Party
! style="background-color:#E9E9E9;text-align:right;" |Votes
! style="background-color:#E9E9E9;text-align:right;" |%
|-
|style="background-color:"|
|align=left|Viktor Medikov (incumbent)
|align=left|Independent
|
|21.76%
|-
|style="background-color:"|
|align=left|Albert Lensky
|align=left|Communist Party
|
|17.94%
|-
|style="background-color:"|
|align=left|Viktor Terentyev
|align=left|Independent
|
|17.12%
|-
|style="background-color:"|
|align=left|Aleksandr Nesterov
|align=left|Liberal Democratic Party
|
|7.83%
|-
|style="background-color:"|
|align=left|Yury Pyl
|align=left|Independent
|
|7.52%
|-
|style="background-color:#1C1A0D"|
|align=left|Valery Myasnikov
|align=left|Forward, Russia!
|
|4.09%
|-
|style="background-color:"|
|align=left|Natalya Ignatyuk
|align=left|Independent
|
|3.96%
|-
|style="background-color:"|
|align=left|Oleg Vostretsov
|align=left|Our Home – Russia
|
|3.63%
|-
|style="background-color:"|
|align=left|Valentina Basargina
|align=left|Independent
|
|3.13%
|-
|style="background-color:"|
|align=left|Igor Bogdanov
|align=left|Independent
|
|1.74%
|-
|style="background-color:#000000"|
|colspan=2 |against all
|
|9.49%
|-
| colspan="5" style="background-color:#E9E9E9;"|
|- style="font-weight:bold"
| colspan="3" style="text-align:left;" | Total
| 
| 100%
|-
| colspan="5" style="background-color:#E9E9E9;"|
|- style="font-weight:bold"
| colspan="4" |Source:
|
|}

1999

|-
! colspan=2 style="background-color:#E9E9E9;text-align:left;vertical-align:top;" |Candidate
! style="background-color:#E9E9E9;text-align:left;vertical-align:top;" |Party
! style="background-color:#E9E9E9;text-align:right;" |Votes
! style="background-color:#E9E9E9;text-align:right;" |%
|-
|style="background-color:"|
|align=left|Sergey Neverov
|align=left|Independent
|
|53.13%
|-
|style="background-color:"|
|align=left|Viktor Neustroyev
|align=left|Independent
|
|18.83%
|-
|style="background-color:"|
|align=left|Viktor Medikov (incumbent)
|align=left|Independent
|
|8.10%
|-
|style="background-color:"|
|align=left|Yelena Yamshchikova
|align=left|Independent
|
|5.66%
|-
|style="background-color:"|
|align=left|Sergey Yeremin
|align=left|Independent
|
|3.20%
|-
|style="background-color:"|
|align=left|Yury Pyl
|align=left|Yabloko
|
|2.75%
|-
|style="background-color:"|
|align=left|Aleksandr Bir
|align=left|Independent
|
|0.21%
|-
|style="background-color:#000000"|
|colspan=2 |against all
|
|6.95%
|-
| colspan="5" style="background-color:#E9E9E9;"|
|- style="font-weight:bold"
| colspan="3" style="text-align:left;" | Total
| 
| 100%
|-
| colspan="5" style="background-color:#E9E9E9;"|
|- style="font-weight:bold"
| colspan="4" |Source:
|
|}

2003

|-
! colspan=2 style="background-color:#E9E9E9;text-align:left;vertical-align:top;" |Candidate
! style="background-color:#E9E9E9;text-align:left;vertical-align:top;" |Party
! style="background-color:#E9E9E9;text-align:right;" |Votes
! style="background-color:#E9E9E9;text-align:right;" |%
|-
|style="background-color:"|
|align=left|Sergey Neverov (incumbent)
|align=left|United Russia
|
|64.09%
|-
|style="background-color:"|
|align=left|Yelena Yamshchikova
|align=left|Independent
|
|12.33%
|-
|style="background-color:"|
|align=left|Andrey Krasakov
|align=left|Liberal Democratic Party
|
|5.39%
|-
|style="background-color:#408080"|
|align=left|Aleksandr Gulnyashkin
|align=left|For a Holy Russia
|
|2.16%
|-
|style="background-color:#164C8C"|
|align=left|Albert Korystov
|align=left|United Russian Party Rus'
|
|0.73%
|-
|style="background-color:#000000"|
|colspan=2 |against all
|
|13.42%
|-
| colspan="5" style="background-color:#E9E9E9;"|
|- style="font-weight:bold"
| colspan="3" style="text-align:left;" | Total
| 
| 100%
|-
| colspan="5" style="background-color:#E9E9E9;"|
|- style="font-weight:bold"
| colspan="4" |Source:
|
|}

2016

|-
! colspan=2 style="background-color:#E9E9E9;text-align:left;vertical-align:top;" |Candidate
! style="background-color:#E9E9E9;text-align:left;vertical-align:top;" |Party
! style="background-color:#E9E9E9;text-align:right;" |Votes
! style="background-color:#E9E9E9;text-align:right;" |%
|-
|style="background-color: " |
|align=left|Alexander Maximov
|align=left|United Russia
|
|74.16%
|-
|style="background-color:"|
|align=left|Stanislav Karpov
|align=left|Liberal Democratic Party
|
|9.43%
|-
|style="background-color:"|
|align=left|Rostislav Bardokin
|align=left|Patriots of Russia
|
|8.24%
|-
|style="background-color:"|
|align=left|Leonid Burakov
|align=left|Communist Party
|
|3.15%
|-
|style="background-color:"|
|align=left|Aleksandr Zaytsev
|align=left|A Just Russia
|
|2.66%
|-
|style="background:"| 
|align=left|Afanasy Yeremkin
|align=left|Communists of Russia
|
|0.86%
|-
|style="background:"| 
|align=left|Yevgeny Yermakov
|align=left|Party of Growth
|
|0.79%
|-
| colspan="5" style="background-color:#E9E9E9;"|
|- style="font-weight:bold"
| colspan="3" style="text-align:left;" | Total
| 
| 100%
|-
| colspan="5" style="background-color:#E9E9E9;"|
|- style="font-weight:bold"
| colspan="4" |Source:
|
|}

2021

|-
! colspan=2 style="background-color:#E9E9E9;text-align:left;vertical-align:top;" |Candidate
! style="background-color:#E9E9E9;text-align:left;vertical-align:top;" |Party
! style="background-color:#E9E9E9;text-align:right;" |Votes
! style="background-color:#E9E9E9;text-align:right;" |%
|-
|style="background-color:"|
|align=left|Alexander Maximov (incumbent)
|align=left|United Russia
|
|59.02%
|-
|style="background-color:"|
|align=left|Tatyana Protas
|align=left|A Just Russia — For Truth
|
|8.40%
|-
|style="background-color:"|
|align=left|Maksim Parshukov
|align=left|Liberal Democratic Party
|
|8.26%
|-
|style="background-color:"|
|align=left|Nikolay Kochetkov
|align=left|Communist Party
|
|7.77%
|-
|style="background:"| 
|align=left|Sergey Yevstiforov
|align=left|Communists of Russia
|
|3.66%
|-
|style="background-color: "|
|align=left|Dmitry Panfilov
|align=left|Party of Pensioners
|
|2.65%
|-
|style="background-color:"|
|align=left|Larisa Kosilova
|align=left|Rodina
|
|2.64%
|-
|style="background-color: " |
|align=left|Kirill Garbuzov
|align=left|New People
|
|2.44%
|-
|style="background-color:"|
|align=left|Vyacheslav Chernov
|align=left|Yabloko
|
|2.03%
|-
| colspan="5" style="background-color:#E9E9E9;"|
|- style="font-weight:bold"
| colspan="3" style="text-align:left;" | Total
| 
| 100%
|-
| colspan="5" style="background-color:#E9E9E9;"|
|- style="font-weight:bold"
| colspan="4" |Source:
|
|}

Notes

References

Russian legislative constituencies
Politics of Kemerovo Oblast